Guugu Yimithirr may refer to:
 Guugu Yimithirr people, an ethnic group of Australia
 Guugu Yimithirr language, their language

Language and nationality disambiguation pages